Wiry-au-Mont is a commune in the Somme department in Hauts-de-France in northern France.

Geography
The commune is situated 16 km (10 miles) south of Abbeville, on the D936 road.

Population

Places of interest
 The war memorial
 The old railway line '''
The railway was opened on 9 May 1872 and was used principally from freight, although some passengers were carried. 
It was finally closed on 10 November 1993. It served the following communes: 
Longpré-les-Corps-Saints / Bettencourt-Rivière / Airaines / Allery / Wiry-au-Mont / Forceville / Oisemont / Cerisy-Buleux / Martainneville / Saint-Maxent / Vismes-au-Val / Maisnières / Longroy and Gamaches

See also
Communes of the Somme department

References

Communes of Somme (department)